The role of fair value accounting in the subprime mortgage crisis of 2008 is controversial.  Fair value accounting was issued as US accounting standard SFAS 157 in 2006 by the privately run Financial Accounting Standards Board (FASB)—delegated by the SEC with the task of establishing financial reporting standards. This required that tradable assets such as mortgage securities be valued according to their current market value rather than their historic cost or some future expected value.  When the market for such securities became volatile and collapsed, the resulting loss of value had a major financial effect upon the institutions holding them even if they had no immediate plans to sell them.

Fair value accounting

Definition of fair value accounting
In 2006, the Financial Accounting Standards Board (FASB) implemented  SFAS 157 in order to expand disclosures about fair value measurements in financial statements. Fair-value accounting or "Mark-to-Market" is defined by FAS 157 as "a price that would be received to sell an asset or paid to transfer a liability in an orderly transaction between market participants at the measurement date". The definition is accompanied by a framework which categorize different types of assets and liabilities into 3 levels, and their measurement varied accordingly. The hierarchy of fair value is:
(1) Assets or liabilities whose values could be observed on an active market of identical assets or liabilities.
(2) Assets or liabilities whose value could be quoted from an inactive market, or based on internal-developed models, with input data from observable markets of similar items.
(3) Financial assets and liabilities whose values couldn't be quoted from an observable market but instead based on prices or valuation techniques that require inputs that are both unobservable and significant to the overall fair value measurement. This requires management estimation that may lead to manipulation.

How Fair-Value Accounting Came into Being

1. Lessons from 1929 Stock Crash Under historical cost accounting, profits came to be calculated as the difference between the income accrued and costs incurred, according to revenue recognition and matching principal. This traditional measure of the profits did not prove adequate to value derivatives. In some cases, historical cost accounting didn't apply because there was little trading cost, (e.g. an interest-rate swap contract). And in other cases, because of the existence of fairly liquid markets and the wide use of valuation methodologies in financial markets to set asset prices, the relevance of historical cost accounting is largely undermined.
In order to improve information transparency, and to better inform investors about the interest and credit risks reflected, FASB began take steps to extend the application of the fair value principle to an ever greater range of assets and liabilities.

2.The Expanding Use of Derivatives In the 1980s, derivatives underwent significant development as they came to be used to hedge against interest and exchange rate risks. Additionally, derivatives started to be used by credit institutions as a new source of business. The large-scale use of derivatives by large and medium-sized corporations, together with the ever growing importance of capital markets, has led to major changes in the traditional practices used to prepare financial statements.

US Savings and Loan Crisis and Fair-Value Accounting
In the late 1980s and early 1990s, the Savings and Loan Crisis precipitated a collapse of the U.S. thrift industry. Investors demanded increased transparency, and historical cost accounting was blamed for creating rooms for banks to underestimate their losses.
In 1991, the Government Accounting Office (GAO) issued a report that urged immediate adoption for both GAAP and regulatory reporting of mark-to-market accounting for all debt securities. It also suggested that a study be undertaken of the potential merits of a comprehensive market-value-based reporting system for banks.
As fair value was increasingly viewed as an important tool for valuation, a clear guidance was needed for better application. In 2006, FASB issued FAS 157, which provided a uniform definition of “fair value” and guidance for application.

The Role Fair-Value Accounting Played in the Subprime mortgage crisis

Fair Value Accounting in Practice

Banks’ asset categories are mostly made up of loans and leases, available-for-sale and held-to-maturity securities, and trading assets. Loans and leases comprise the biggest and most important category for most banks. These assets are classified as either “held-for-investment,” or “held-for-sale”, accounted for at the lower of historical cost or fair value. Ultimately, most of the assets held by financial institutions were either not subject to fair value, or did not impact the income statement or balance sheet accounts.  However, a large minority of the assets were “held-for-sale” or trading assets.  The loans and securities in the held-for-sale classification are tested for impairment and, if impaired, written down to the present value of future cash flows. Loans are usually impaired because creditors will be unable to collect all amounts due but if classified as “held-for-sale” can also be deemed impaired under FAS157 if their market value falls for an extended period of time.

Furthermore, all derivatives are treated as trading assets and are marked to market. However, as the crisis evolved and liquidity deteriorated, fair value assets held by banks increasingly became Level 3 inputs because their market prices became unobservable. 

As mentioned in the 2010 article written by Laux and Leuz, linking banking capital regulation and fair value accounting is the most plausible way fair value accounting could have contributed to the crisis: Asset prices deviate from their fundamental values, which causes a bank to write down its assets and, in turn, depletes its capital. Consequently, the asset write-downs may force the bank to sell such assets at fire sale prices and start a downward spiral. This causes a contagion problem and forces other banks to take similar write-downs. However, according to Laux and Leuz, this is not what typically happens in banks’ practices.

One of the causes:
Brian S. Wesbury, Chief Economist, and Robert Stein, Senior Economist at First Trust Advisors in their “Economic Commentary” claimed that “It is true that the root of this crisis is bad mortgage loans, but probably 70% of the real crisis that we face today is caused by mark-to-market accounting in an illiquid market".

Critics have blamed fair-value accounting for the subprime crisis, pointing out that fair-value accounting created difficulties measuring the value of subprime positions. They claim that fair-value accounting contributed to excessive leverage used by banks during boom period, and led to a downward spiral during bust period, forcing banks to value assets at “fire-sale” prices, creating a much lower than necessary valuation of subprime assets, which caused contagion and engendered the tightened lending. 

There has been debate on whether fair value accounting contributed to the crisis or simply was the messenger of the crisis. The opponents of fair value believe it is the contributor to the crisis. Opponents, such as FDIC chairman William Isaac and House Speaker Newt Gingrich, lobbied and urged for the suspension of mark-to-market accounting. Clearly, the lobbying has been an issue of debate as well – one that proponents are not pleased with, as lobbying the FASB presents an issue of its independence.

One argument is that a majority of structured debt, corporate bonds and mortgages were still performing, but their prices had fallen below their true value due to frozen markets (contagion as discussed above). Opponents also state that fair value accounting undermines critical foundations of financial reporting, including verifiability, reliability and conservatism. It is argued that fair value accounting lacks all three attributes. Some opponents may even suggest that historical cost accounting is more accurate by arguing that financial institutions are forced to record any permanent impairment in the market value of their assets.

Just a messenger:

On the other hand, proponents for fair value accounting believe that fair value was not the cause of the crisis. Instead, they suggest fair value only communicated the effects of poor decisions, such as subprime loans. Proponents also believe that fair value accounting provides investors with transparency into the assets and liabilities of companies. There are empirical foundations that prove fair value accounting to be a better indicator of value than historical cost. Removing transparency by using historical cost accounting may make matters worse. It is possible the market reacts more extremely if the fair-value or current market prices are not disclosed. There is no empirical evidence that using historical cost accounting will calm the investors.

Proponents argue that fair value accounting provides a clear measurement of the underlying value of assets. They state that the subprime crisis was not caused by accounting, but by bad operating of firms, investors and sometimes by fraud. It is unfair to blame the fair value accounting that is merely a reflection of the actual problem. 
“Fair value accounting…is a fundamental mechanism to provide investors with important transparency…. The roots of today’s crisis have many causes, but fair value accounting is not one of them.”
--Scott Evans, Executive Vice President, Asset Management at TIAA-CREF at October 2008 SEC roundtable on mark-to-market accounting (pg. 17)

“Death spiral”, contagion and systemic risk
Banks are required to maintain “adequate capital” to comply with regulatory requirements. The capital ratios are the percentage of bank’s capital to its risk-weighted assets and total assets. Adequately capitalized banks are required to have Tier 1 capital and total capital not lower than set percentages of the banks' risk-weighted assets and total assets.  These calculations are defined by the Basel Accords as implemented by each country's banking regulators.  At the beginning of the crisis, the values of mortgage-backed assets started to fall, and firms holding mortgage-backed assets had to write those assets down to market value, the bank’s regulatory capital went down. Under their regulatory capital requirements, banks were forced to sell mortgage-backed assets for cash to reduce “risk adjusted assets”. Some firms also sold because of a fear that prices would decline further. The fire sale created an excess supply which further drove down the market price of mortgage-backed assets and the regulatory capital of banks continued to decline. This phenomenon is referred to as the “death spiral”.

Moreover, death spiral can lead to “financial contagion”. If fire-sale prices from a distressed bank become relevant marks for other banks, mark-to-market accounting can cause write-downs and regulatory capital problems for otherwise sound banks (Cifuentes, Ferrucci, and Shin, 2005; Allen and Carletti, 2008; Heaton, Lucas, and McDonald, 2009). This is considered to be systemic risk in the banking industry.

As with any standard setting body, the FASB was faced with tradeoffs when it made the decision to implement this new standard. Since this is an imperfect world with information problems, it is difficult to know what the absolute best option is. This is why it is important that the FASB, along with all other participants in the financial environment, become knowledgeable in their fields, and assess how their decisions and performance may affect others. This stands true for auditors and their role in the financial markets and crisis.

Looking Forward: the Potential of Double-Presentation
To strike the balance between reliability and relevance, some scholars propose a double-disclosure—fair-value measurement backed up by historical cost figures: "The best way to ensure that regulators, investors, and the market at large have a full understanding of banks’ true financial conditions is to include changes in the value of financial instruments over time in financial statements, along with historical cost figures."
In fact, FASB is not planning to abandon historical cost accounting for financial
instruments held for collection or payment of contractual cash flows, because it provides useful information about the potential cash flows associated with these financial instruments. Indeed, the difference between amortized cost and fair value captures the expected
impact of current economic conditions on existing financial instruments. FASB is recommending for financial instruments held for collection or
payment of contractual cash flows that amortized cost and fair value information be given equal prominence on the financial statements and, thus, that both measures be made available for these financial instruments in public releases of financial reporting information. This dual presentation in financial statements — which some investors have asked for—would ensure that both relevant measures are given adequate attention by banks and their auditors.

References

Subprime mortgage crisis
Valuation (finance)
Real estate valuation